The Yaté River is a river of New Caledonia. It has a catchment area of 450 square kilometres. A major mining area, the Yaté Dam lies near the mouth and the town of Yaté.

See also
List of rivers of New Caledonia

References

Rivers of New Caledonia